The Random Formation is a rock unit in Newfoundland dating to the early Cambrian period, dominated by tidal quartz arenites deposited in a near-shore environment, but also incorporating intertidal and open-shelf deposits, including glauconitic and mud-cracked mudstones (now shales), and red channel sandstones.  It was deposited quickly and is approximately 175 m thick. The Blue Pinion Formation was originally recognized as a separate formation, but is now interpreted as an expression of the Random Formation.

Sedimentology 
Its white arenitic sandstones are very distinctive, recognizable from their herringbone cross-stratification that denotes the influence of storm systems.  Interbedded green-grey sands and silts represent an intertidal setting.

Spatial distribution
It is widespread throughout Newfoundland unlike its underlying units. It was deposited in intertidal mud flats to subtidal setting, then (later) near the bottom of an open marine shelf.

The top of the unit intergrades with the overlying strata.

Stratigraphy

Some studies assign the Random Formation as the lowest unit of the Adeyton Group, but strictly it is below that group.

It overlies the Chapel Island formation, which contains the Precambrian/Cambrian boundary.

The unit is often strongly folded.

Age

The formation is difficult to date, but is considered Precambrian, as it lies unconformably under the Bonavista Formation and conformably above Ediacaran strata.
It does sit above the Chapel Island Formation on the Burin peninsula meaning that, at that location, the lower boundary is in the Lower Cambrian. Inarticulate brachiopods have been found in its upper strata, dating these to the late early or even early mid Cambrian.

However, it is likely that the unit is diachronous and may date into the Ediacaran further to the east.

The Cambrian stage 2 - stage 3 boundary (Tommotian/Atdabanian) has been reported as being within the Random Formation, or possibly in the overlying Bonavista Formation. The overlying Smith Point Formation hosts the first trilobites.

Palaeontology 
The trilobite-like trace fossils Rusophycus and Cruziana occur in the Random Formation, alongside a range of other ichnofossils including  Diplocraterion, Paleodictyon,
Scolicia, and Squamodictyon.
Body fossils include the small shelly fauna Aldanella attleborensis'' assemblage.

References 

Rock formations of Canada